State Statistics Committee of Ukraine (Derzhavnyi Komitet Statystyky Ukrainy) is the government agency responsible for collection and dissemination of statistics in Ukraine. For brevity it was also referred to as Derzhkomstat. In 2010 the committee was transformed into the State Service of Statistics under the Ministry of Economic Development and Trade.

Institutions
Science and Research Institute of Statistics, keeps track of the Classification of objects of the administrative-territorial system of Ukraine

See also
Ukrainian Census (2001), Censuses in Ukraine

External links 
Official website (Ukrainian, Russian, English)
2001 Ukraine Census
Presidential decree #1085/2010 "For optimization the system of central bodies of executive power (Ukrainian)

Statistics
Ukraine
Ministry of Economic Development, Trade and Agriculture